Moshe Ron (1925 in Warsaw, Poland – 2001 in Haifa, Israel) is an Israeli materials scientist, specializing in metal hydrides.

Biography 
Moshe Ron (Zilberman) was born in Poland. His family escaped to USSR before World War II. He started his academic education in soviet Central Asia during the war. After the war he tried to immigrate to Mandatory Palestine, but spent two years at Cyprus.
He got his degree from the Hebrew University in Jerusalem.
He did research on the Mössbauer effect in metals.
Moshe Ron was the organizer and scientific supervisor of the Laboratory of Hydrogen Energy at Technion - Israel Institute of Technology. He contributed to the development of heat pumps based on use of metal hydrides. His research was supported by Daimler-Benz AG and Stuttgart University.

Main publications 
    M. Ron.    J. Less-Common Metals 104, (1984) 259.
    M. Ron et al.  Israeli Patenr # 55403 (1982);  USA Patent # .4,436,539 (1982).
    M. Ron  and Y. Josephy. Z. Phys. Chem. N. F. 147, (1966), 241.
    M. Ron  and Y. Josephy. Z. Phys. Chem. N. F. 164, (1989), 1478.
    M. Ron  and Y. Josephy.Proceed. "International Workshop on Metal Hydrides for Hydrogen Storage Purification and Thermodyn. Devices". 1988, Stuttgart, Germany.
    M. Ron. " A Vehicle Driven by Hydrogen within a City and Air Conditioned". Study, submitted to Daimler - Benz, 1993.
    E. Bershadski, A. Klyuch and M. Ron. International Journal of Hydrogen Energy, 20 (1995) p. 29.
    M.  Ron,  E. Bershadsky and Y. Josephy. International Journal of Hydrogen Energy, 17, (1992) 623.
    M. Ron.   US Patent # 4,507,263  1985  ; US Patent # 4,607,826  1986.
    Y. Yosephy, Y. Eisenberg, S. Peretz,  A. Ben-David and M.Ron. J. Less-Common Metals 104, (1984) 297.
    E. Bershadsky,  Y. Josephy and M. Ron.  J. Less-Common Metals 153, (1989) 65.

1925 births
2001 deaths
20th-century Polish Jews
Hebrew University of Jerusalem alumni
Israeli materials scientists
Polish emigrants to the Soviet Union
Soviet emigrants to Israel
Jewish scientists
Scientists from Warsaw